The Last Samurai also known as "Ōkami yo Rakujitsu o Kire" is a 1974 Japanese jidaigeki film, directed by Kenji Misumi. Based on Shōtarō Ikenami's novel "Sonootoko". The film is Kenji Misumi's last film.

Plot
Set in the end of Edo period in Kyoto. Sugi, a young samurai found a new father in the person of Ikemoto from whom he learned the art of the sword (Mugai ryu). Ikemoto, a spy in the pay of the Tokugawa shogun and sensing the near end of the samurai world, implores Sugi to stay away from the political struggles and violent conflicts.  Sugi makes friends with four guys (samurai), but ruthless fate is waiting for them.

Cast
 Hideki Takahashi : Toranosuke Sugi
 Ken Ogata : Hanjirō Nakamura / Kirino Toshiaki
 Takahiro Tamura : Mohei Ikemoto
 Masaomi Kondō : Hachiro Iba
 Kiwako Taichi : Ohide
 Keiko Matsuzaka : Reiko
 Jūkei Fujioka as Murata
 Teruhiko Saigō : Okita Sōji
 Jirō Sakagami
 Taketoshi Naito : Sugi Hirazaemon
 Tōru Minegishi : Aizawa
 Asao Sano : Kingoro Yamaguchi
 Ryutaro Tatsumi : Takamori Saigo
 Kenji Imai : Togo Naoji

References

External links

1974 films
Films directed by Kenji Misumi
Jidaigeki films
Samurai films
Films set in Bakumatsu
1970s Japanese films